Jackson Sosthenes is the Bishop of Dar es Salaam.

Background

Jackson Sosthenes is an evangelical who was educated at the Trinity School for Ministry in the United States.
In September 2016 Pastor Jackson Sosthenes led a mass at St Albans Cathedral Church in Dar es Salaam where President John Magufuli called on all churches, religions and political parties to love each other and work together to help the nation develop.

Consecration

On 7 January 2017 Archbishop Jacob Chimeledya deposed Bishop Valentino Mokiwa of Dar es Salaam.
Mokiwa was deposed after he refused to resign after a corruption probe uncovered mismanagement of church assets.
On 2 March 2017 Chimeledya licensed Augustino Ramadhani, a former Chief Justice of Tanzania, as a priest of the Diocese of Mpwapwa and appointed him to lead the diocese of Dar es Salaam in place of Mokiwa.
Sosthenes was consecrated bishop of the diocese by Chimeledya on 4 Feb 2018.
President John Magufuli spoke soon after the ordainment, and called for religious leaders  to encourage forgiveness and resolve conflicts that create divisions among worshipers.

Notes

Sources

Anglican bishops of Dar es Salaam
Year of birth missing (living people)
Living people
Tanzanian Anglicans